Selim Kuneralp (born July 9, 1951 in Prague) is a retired Turkish diplomat.

Early life 
He is the grandson of Ali Kemal and the son of Zeki Kuneralp. His father Zeki was half-brother of Stanley Johnson's father, making Selim first cousin once removed of British prime minister Boris Johnson. Kuneralp graduated from Lycée Saint-Joseph, Istanbul in 1969. He graduated from the London School of Economics in 1973.

Career 
After various assignments at the Ministry of Foreign Affairs (as an ambassador), he served as the General Directorate for EU Affairs and ambassador in Sweden (2000-2003) and South Korea (2003-2005). 

He served as the General Director of Policy Planning in 2006-2007 and as Deputy Undersecretary in charge of Economic Affairs between 2007-2009. He served as the Permanent Representative to the European Union from 1 November 2009 to 9 December 2011. He served as President of the Energy Charter Conference beginning in April 2010, and as the Deputy Secretary General of the Energy Charter between 1 December 2014 and 31 July 2016. 

He became Advisor to the Ministry of Foreign Affairs at the beginning of 2012 and worked as Permanent Representative of Turkey to the World Trade Organization in May 2012 and continued this duty until February 2014. He was appointed as a member of the Foreign Policy Advisory Board on 15 July 2014. He retired In 2015.

References

Ambassadors of Turkey to South Korea
Ambassadors of Turkey to Sweden
21st-century Turkish diplomats
1951 births
Living people
Turkish Muslims